Haimbachia flavalis is a moth in the family Crambidae. It was described by George Hampson in 1919. It is found in Sri Lanka.

References

Haimbachiini
Moths described in 1919